Lebia menetriesi is a species of ground beetles in the Harpalinae subfamily that can be found in Ukraine and southern part of Russia.

References

Lebia
Beetles described in 1869
Beetles of Europe